Marina del Pilar Avila Olmeda (born 19 October 1985) ​ is a Mexican lawyer, politician, and member of the National Regeneration Movement (MORENA) political party, currently serving as Governor of Baja California, she is the first woman as governor. She was formerly a Federal Representative for Baja California's 2nd electoral district at the LXIV Legislature in the Chamber of Deputies of the General Congress of the United Mexican States, which she fulfilled from 2018 to 2019, also the first woman as Mayor of Mexicali, from 2019 to 2021.

Personal life 
Marina del Pilar Avila Olmeda was born on 19 October 1985, in Mexicali, Baja California, Mexico; her parents are Marina del Pilar Olmeda Garcia and José Francisco Avila Hernández, both lawyers and scholars.

Avila Olmeda has recalled in interviews that she had a very happy childhood and early inclinations for public duty, as it grew onto her by the permanent presence of legal and political topics in her home due to the nature of her parent's professions.

She was involved in cultural activities such as ballet and music lessons at a young age.  She also spent her time in sport-like activities such as charrería, and ever since it has been an ongoing passion in her life.

Avila recalls the time she decided to actively pursue politics, receiving unconditional support from her family, coinciding with the birth of her first daughter, also named Marina del Pilar, known publicly as "Marinita" after herself and her mother.

On 29 September 2019, Avila Olmeda married Carlos Torres Torres, and both celebrated their newlywed's ties with family and friends.

Marina del Pilar Avila Olmeda announced her second pregnancy on 8 July 2021. She made it public via social media with a photograph of her husband by her side, both holding a picture of the ultrasound.

Avila announced she would not apply for maternity leave and proceeded to make history by becoming Mexico's first pregnant head of state government; on 12 January 2022, she gave birth to her second son, Diego José and continued working remotely from home for a couple of days following the delivery, under her doctor's recommendations.

Education 
In 2009, Marina del Pilar graduated with a Law Degree from Centro de Enseñanza Técnica y Superior (CETYS Universidad), obtaining the Distinguished Alumni Recognition for High Academic Achievement and subsequently enrolled in two master's degrees.

She obtained her first master's degree in 2011 for Public Law from the School of Graduates in Government and Public Policies of Monterrey Institute of Technology and Higher Education, with the thesis: "The Age of Criminal Responsibility in the Mexican Legal System."; the second degree was acquired in 2016 for Public Administration by the Social and Political Sciences Faculty of the Autonomous University of Baja California; where after a selection phase, she obtained a CONACYT Scholarship.

In her path through academia, Avila published various articles in legal magazines and editorials, just like the one titled "Evolution of the Electoral Institute and Citizen Participation in Baja California"; also participating as a co-author in a chapter titled "Reflections surrounding academic teaching and investigation on Constitutional Law for legal training" in the book "Constitutionalism. Two centuries from her origins in Latin America", published by the Institute of Juridical Investigations of the National Autonomous University of Mexico.

Marina del Pilar kept evolving in her academic career as a scholar in the Social and Political Sciences Faculty of the Autonomous University of Baja California. In different interviews and public speeches, she has stated that her students were a big part of her inspiration in partaking in a leading role in local politics.

Political career

Early Political Career 
Marina del Pilar Avila Olmeda became a member of the National Regeneration Movement (MORENA) political party in 2015, encouraged by the principles of the Party's National Leader back then, Andrés Manuel López Obrador. She already had a trajectory as a lawyer and scholar; nevertheless, she ran as a candidate for Local Representative of the 3rd District in State Congress; even though she did not win, Avila assures to have "succeeded in the streets" because of the connection she had made with the electorates. At the end of this election, in 2016, she was titled as Coordinator of  Organization for Morena in Mexicali, Baja California.

Campaign for Federal Representative (2018) 
In 2018, Marina del Pilar ran as a candidate for Federal Representative to the 2nd electoral district, by the "Juntos Haremos Historia" (Together We Will Make History) coalition, consisting of the National Regeneration Movement (MORENA), the Labor Party (PT), and the Social Encounter Party (PES). Proposing on early debates to lower public transport fees for college students and elderly adults and lower taxes in her state.

In this electoral process, Avila received violent threats for her to abandon the race; she was also a victim of gender and political violence, as she recalls in a Yahoo! News interview:"When I made public my intentions to participate as a candidate, the Delegate of Morena in Baja California, in 2018, told me he was interested in me. I didn't understand it as violence; I even began apologizing if I ever conducted myself in a misinterpreted manner. Yet I kept working with the limitation I had gotten from this person. Even after all that, I managed to become a candidate. It is something I've kept quiet for so long because I was too ashamed to share it."After everything mentioned before, the candidate continued her campaign, taking a strong position against violence towards women. Del Pilar spoke openly about the necessity to embrace investigation protocols and strengthen capacitance for public servers that deal with femicides, likewise, she calls to reinforce prevention and attend the signs of violence in the early stages of relationships and domestic violence seriously.

That's how on 1 July 2018, Marina del Pilar Avila Olmeda became a Federal Representative to Baja California's 2nd congressional district at the LXIV Legislature in the Chamber of Deputies of the General Congress of the United Mexican States. It came to be a historic election for Mexico; parallel to Avila's triumph, Andrés Manuel López Obrador became President of Mexico, passing in history as the country's most voted President of the country.

Baja California's Federal Representative (2018-2019) 
Avila began her functions as a Federal Representative on 1 September 2018, participating as Secretary in the Metropolitan and Urban Development, Territorial Planning and Mobility Committee, and member in the Committees of Northern Border Affairs, Governance and Population. Regarding her work in Congress, her highlights are her passed initiatives to increase the penalty for those who commit the criminal act of sexual tourism; the other one is to typify the acts of domestic violence as a felony that requires pre-trial detention.

Other notable contributions in her labor as Congresswoman include the reduction of value-added taxes in Mexico's northern border, the transparency at disclosing state assets, attention to the migratory crisis in the state, reduction of public transportation fees, and the releases of resources towards renovating International Border Crossing in Mexicali.

On 1 March 2019, she applied for a leave license which permitted her to run for Mayor's Office of the city of Mexicali.

Campaign for Mayor (2019) 
Avila began her campaign for Mayor as a candidate postulated for the "Juntos Haremos Historia" (Together We Will Make History) coalition, consisting of the National Regeneration Movement (MORENA), the Labor Party (PT), Ecologist Green Party of Mexico (PVEM) and Transformemos (Let’s Transform). On 15 April 2019, her first public appearance was at 7 am at a busy crossroad, accompanied by fellow party members and supporters.

During the electoral process, Marina del Pilar was once again a target of political violence regarding her gender and also suffered a series of attacks on her personal life, which she has stated before in interviews:"(…) I was pointed out for my physical appearance, even my smile was a topic up for debate, issues that aren't important for candidacy, nor for the wielding of public service.".

"(…) I encountered an extremely violent campaign against myself and my external appearance, also the simple fact being a young woman and a single mother too, at the time. They didn't spare my private life either, like my daughter; they still do so today."On 29 May 2019, the campaign for Mayor's Office came to an end. In front of thousands of citizens, Avila closed with these priority issues: security, excellence in public services, improved roadways, the decline in air contamination and better infrastructure for the city.

On the day of election, 2 June 2019, Marina del Pilar triumphed as the new City Mayor, with 45.46% of the votes. On 13 June, the Institute of Electoral Elections of Baja California gave Avila her constancy of majority, acknowledging her officially as Mayor-Elect of Mexicali.

At the end of July 2021, Mayor-Elect Avila started her transitional activities and began to introduce her work team, who took the oath of office alongside her on 30 September 2019, right on the Mexicali's Historical Centre, becoming so the first elected women to serve as Mayor in this city.

Mexicali's City Mayor (2019-2021) 
Avila commenced serving as Mayor on 1 October 2019, and shortly began to fulfill her campaign promises, such as inaugurating Municipal Institute for Women, as well as offices and lines for Pink Force, to give preventive attention to women at risk of violence. She revised preexistent anomalies in the infrastructure sector that led to the cancellation of 27 projects from the past administration, which was bided again and ended up as an investment towards the city for 32'195,492 Mexican pesos.

Other distinctive projects under her administration were about culture and the arts; in her first weeks in office, "Chinese Day" was officially established on 12 November as a memorial day to celebrate the Chinese community, given it’s significance in developing the city. Avila funded projects like the modernization of Mexicali's Historical Centre, which was an investment of 39.1 million Mexican pesos. After reparations ended, social and touristic activities reactivated in the famous "Chinesca," and the "Wok Museum" of Chinese food inaugurated as a symbol of fellowship between both cultures.

In her first year mark, Avila disclosed to have had the lowest crime incidence in the last ten years of the city's record, with a decrease of 12%.

January 2021, the pollster house Consulta Mitofsky placed Marina del Pilar Avila Olmeda in the top 3 mayors best evaluated in Mexico, attributed to Avila's strengthening of healthy finances for the city, as well as a transparent government.

In March 2021, she applied for a leave license to postulate in the State Governor election race. Via her social media, she bid farewell to her team at the Mayor's Office, had a last visit through City Hall's Office, went down the parking lot, and left the municipality installations.

Campaign for Governor 
On April 4, 2021, Marina del Pilar began her campaign as a candidate for Governor  at San Quintín, Baja California; postulated by the "Juntos Haremos Historia" (Together We Will Make History) coalition (consisting of the National Regeneration Movement [MORENA], the Labor Party [PT], and the Ecologist Green Party of Mexico [PVEM]). Her campaign has been described as "Mexico's best campaign" from the 2021's election season.

Her central positions focused on promoting public welfare programs, boosting creative and touristic industries, reactivating economic investments for the region, increasing sports culture, and most notably reinforcing security for all citizens.

Avila got recognition for running her campaign alongside a program titled "Wellness for Baja California's Youth Agenda," created by young people. It covered topics like culture, sports, sustainability, security, welfare, and establishing mechanisms to guarantee youth participation in public policies.

Marina del Pilar was a victim of verbal attacks qualified as political and gender violence by the Tribunal of Electoral Justice of Baja California. Nevertheless, the candidate’s poll numbers were not affected thanks to efficient use of social media, intertwined with her physical campaign, she became a favorite to obtain the title of Governor. The then-candidate had campaign closure events all over the state, coming to an all end in the city of Tijuana event with over 20,000 attendees.

On June 6, 2021, election day, Avila obtained 542, 035 votes, representing 48.4950% of voters, and with that majority became Governor-Elect. Celebrating her triumph in Mexicali, where she once again stated before its citizens her commitment to her party's principles, "don't lie, don't steal, and don't betray".

The Electoral Institute of Baja California validated Avila's triumph and rewarded her with the constancy of majority on June 15, which accredited her officially as Governor-Elect. In August, she began the transition period where she named members of her cabinet and started developing critical projects for their new administration.

Marina del Pilar Avila Olmeda took the oath of office on October 31, in Mexicali; among the attendees stood out the Secretary of Economy, Tatiana Clouthier; head of government of Mexico City, Claudia Sheinbaum; and National Regeneration Movement's National Leader, Mario Delgado. Avila came to become the first woman in Baja California, to serve as Governor, also the youngest one, and Mexico's first to take an oath of office as a State Governor while being pregnant.

Governor of Baja California (2021-Present) 
In her first public act in office, Governor Avila met with a group of Baja Californian athletes who were representatives in Tokyo's 2020 Olympic Games: Aremi Fuentes, Alexa Moreno y Luis Álvarez "El Abuelo", where she handed out economic assistance, as a sense of recognition and encouragement into their Works, and to carry out her campaign promises with local athletes.

Marina del Pilar had already accomplished campaign promises during her first months, such as supporting winegrowing in Baja California through Decree that eliminates sales taxes to the revenue from wine sales.

On November 24, 2021, she presented the first edition of "Miércoles de Mañanera", where every Wednesday, she leads a press conference and discloses vital projects for the state and relevant topics of the week; which algo has a Q&A section for media reporters.

Near the end of November, she executed actions and projects to eradicate violence against women, presenting a program that consists of the installation of "Puntos Naranjas", specific first-aid locations through cities and towns in the state for women who suffer or are at risk of any aggression. In Tijuana, she presented the "Violet Transport" program, which gives exclusive and free of charge public transportation to women and their children.

In her first work tour alongside President Andrés Manuel Lopez Obrador, the head of state, reassured the complete support and solidarity for Governor Avila and his commitment to work coordinately for the wellbeing of vulnerable groups in the region.

According to Consulta Mitofsky, Marina del Pilar has an approval rating by Baja's citizens of 61.7%, thus positions her as the top 4th of State Governors in Mexico and the top 1st in National Regeneration Movement's National (MORENA) Party in approval ratings.

References 

|-

|-

Living people
1985 births
Morena (political party) politicians
People from Mexicali
Politicians from Baja California
21st-century Mexican politicians
21st-century Mexican women politicians
Women members of the Chamber of Deputies (Mexico)
Deputies of the LXIV Legislature of Mexico
Women mayors of places in Mexico
Women governors of States of Mexico
Members of the Chamber of Deputies (Mexico) for Baja California
Mexican Roman Catholics